Aymen Mathlouthi (born 14 September 1984), also known as Balbouli, is a Tunisian professional footballer who plays as a goalkeeper for Étoile du Sahel.

Regarded by pundits as the best Tunisian goalkeepers and one of the best African goalkeepers of all-time, some of his highlighted traits apart from goalkeeping, is his smooth ball control with his feet, and dribbling inside the penalty area. Mathlouthi won the 2011 African Nations Championship held in Sudan. The Confederation of African Football (CAF) chose Mathlouthi as the best goalkeeper in the 2015 Africa Cup of Nations held in Equatorial Guinea, being also included in the CAF Team of the Tournament. He was Tunisia's starting goalkeeper vs Panama at the last group stage match of the 2018 World Cup, which also marked his World Cup debut. Called-up for the 2022 World Cup, it will be his second representing his country.

Club career
From his earliest years, Mathlouthi joined the team's training center in his hometown (Djebel Lahmar in El Omrane), at the "Jeunesse Sportive d'El Omrane", where he trained as a goalkeeper.

In 1995, he decided to join Club Africain. In 2001, he joined the senior team of the team and stayed with them for 2 years. Later, he joined Étoile du Sahel based in Sousse in 2003 and achieved all possible national and continental glory at the club. He also participated at the 2007 FIFA Club World Cup in Japan and finished in fourth place after defeating Mexican team CF Pachuca in the quarter-finals 1–0.

On 27 January 2018, he joined Saudi club Al-Batin on a free transfer. On 23 July 2018, he returned to Club Africain, where he started his professional career, in a two-year deal. He later returned to Saudi Arabia, this time to Al-Adalah and then came back to Étoile du Sahel.

International career
Mathlouthi received his first call-up with the Tunisia national football team for the first time to replace Adel Nefzi in a 2008 Africa Cup of Nations qualification match against the Seychelles on 23 March 2007. Since then, he has played constantly. He participated in all editions of Africa Cup of Nations since 2010 and 2011 African Nations Championship.

In June 2018 he was named in Tunisia’s 23-man squad for the 2018 FIFA World Cup in Russia. After sitting on the bench of two matches, he was finally given the chance to make his historic World Cup debut in the final game against Panama due to injuries of Mouez Hassen and Farouk Ben Mustapha.

Personal life
Mathlouthi married on 13 May 2016. He celebrated his wedding in Sousse surrounded by his family and friends from Étoile du Sahel and the Tunisian team.

Career statistics

International

Honours

Club
ES Sahel
Tunisian Ligue Professionnelle 1: 2007, 2016
Tunisian Cup: 2012, 2014, 2015
CAF Champions League: 2007
CAF Confederation Cup: 2006, 2015
CAF Super Cup: 2008
African Cup Winners' Cup: 2003

International
Tunisia
African Nations Championship: 2011

Individual
Mathlouthi was named in the substitutes of the 2016 CAF Team of The Year, but was the First-Choice Goalkeeper in 2017.

References

External links

1984 births
Living people
Footballers from Tunis
Tunisian footballers
Association football goalkeepers
Tunisia international footballers
2008 Africa Cup of Nations players
2010 Africa Cup of Nations players
Étoile Sportive du Sahel players
Al Batin FC players
Al-Adalah FC players
2011 African Nations Championship players
2012 Africa Cup of Nations players
2013 Africa Cup of Nations players
2015 Africa Cup of Nations players
2017 Africa Cup of Nations players
Tunisian expatriate footballers
Tunisian expatriate sportspeople in Saudi Arabia
Expatriate footballers in Saudi Arabia
Expatriate footballers in India
Saudi Professional League players
Club Africain players
2018 FIFA World Cup players
Mohun Bagan AC players
I-League players
Tunisian Ligue Professionnelle 1 players
Tunisia A' international footballers
2022 FIFA World Cup players